Johari Amini (born 1935) is an African American poet, author, and chiropractor.

Amini was born Jewel Lattimore in Philadelphia in 1935. She cofounded the Third World Press in 1967 and was a staff member of the Institute of Positive Education. She also contributed to other Black Arts Movement institutions such as the Writers Workshop of the Organization of Black American Culture (OBAC), its publication NOMMO, the Kuumba Theater, and the Gwendolyn Brooks Writers' Workshop. She co-founded and edited Black Books Bulletin. She has written many poems and short stories published in journals such as Black World. She was also a practicing chiropractor. She wrote a book titled A Commonsense Approach to Eating (1975) that merged her two career paths.

Selected works 
 Images in Black (1967)
 Black Essence (1968)
 A Folk Fable (1969)
 Let's Go Somewhere (1970)
 A Hip Tale in Death Style (1970)
 A Commonsense Approach to Eating (1975).

References

American women editors
Living people
American chiropractors
American women short story writers
African-American women writers
American women poets
1935 births
20th-century African-American women
20th-century African-American people